

T 
Terra Mítica (Benidorm, Spain)
Thorpe Park (Chertsey, Surrey, England)
Tianmen Mountain (Zhangjiajie, Hunan, China)
Tianzishan (Zhangjiajie, Hunan, China)
Tinkertown (Winnipeg, Manitoba, Canada)
Tivoli Gardens (Copenhagen, Denmark)
Tobu Zoo (Saitama, Japan)
Tokyo Disney Resort (Urayasu, Chiba, Japan)
Tokyo Disneyland 
Tokyo DisneySea
Tokyo Dome City (Tokyo, Japan) 
Toverland (Sevenum, Netherlands)
Tweetsie Railroad (Boone, North Carolina, United States)
Tykkimäki (Kouvola, Finland)

U 
Universal Orlando Resort (Orlando, Florida, United States)
Universal Studios Florida 
Universal's Islands of Adventure
Universal's Epic Universe
Universal Studios Hollywood (Los Angeles, California, United States)
Universal Studios Japan (Osaka, Japan)
Universal Studios Singapore (Sentosa Island, Singapore)
Upper Clements Park (Nova Scotia)

V 
De Valkenier (Valkenburg, Limburg, Netherlands)
Valleyfair (Shakopee, Minnesota, United States)
Veegaland (Kochi, Kerala, India)
Volcano Bay (Orlando, Florida, United States)

W 
Waldameer Park (Erie, Pennsylvania, United States)
Walibi Belgium (Wavre, Belgium)
Walibi Holland (Biddinghuizen, Netherlands)
Walygator Parc (Maizieres-Les-Metz, Lorraine, France)
Walt Disney World (Lake Buena Vista, Florida, United States)
Magic Kingdom
Epcot
Disney's Hollywood Studios
Disney's Animal Kingdom 
Water Kingdom (Mumbai, India)
Water Country USA (Williamsburg, Virginia, United States)
Watermouth Castle (North Devon, England, United Kingdom)
West Edmonton Mall (Edmonton, Alberta, Canada)
Wet 'n Wild (Orlando, Florida and Greensboro, North Carolina, United States)
White Water Branson (Branson, Missouri, United States)
White Water World (Gold Coast, Queensland, Australia)
Wicksteed Park (Kettering, Northamptonshire, England)
Wild Adventures (Valdosta, Georgia, United States)
Wild Rivers Waterpark (Irvine, California, United States)
Wild Waves Theme Park (Federal Way, Washington, United States)
Wild Wild Wet (Pasir Ris, Singapore)
Wobbies World (Nunawading, Victoria, Australia)
World Waterpark (Edmonton, Alberta, Canada)
Worlds of Fun (Kansas City, Missouri, United States)
Wonderla (Bangalore, Karnataka, India)
Wonderland Amusement Park (Amarillo, Texas, United States)
Worlds of Wonder Amusement Park (Noida, Uttar Pradesh, India)

Y 
Yas Waterworld (Yas Island, United Arab Emirates)
Yokohama Cosmo World (Yokohama, Japan)
Yomiuriland (Tokyo, Japan)

Z 
Zoom Flume (East Durham, New York)
Zhangjiajie National Forest Park (Zhangjiajie, Hunan, China)

References

T